TDFA may refer to:

Tennessee Department of Finance and Administration
Thiruvananthapuram District Football Association
Tagged Deterministic Finite Automaton